Longchamp or Longchamps may refer to:

Companies 
 Longchamp (company), a French leather goods company, founded in 1948
 Longchamps (glassware), a US brand of French glassware maker Arc International
 Longchamps (chain of restaurants), a 20th-century restaurant chain in New York City

Place name

Argentina 
 Longchamps, Buenos Aires, a city in Greater Buenos Aires, Argentina

France 
 Longchamp, Côte-d'Or, in the Côte-d'Or department
 Longchamp, Haute-Marne, in the Haute-Marne department
 Longchamp, Vosges, in the Vosges department
 Longchamp-sous-Châtenois, in the Vosges department
 Longchamp-sur-Aujon, in the Aube department
 Longchamps, Eure, in the Eure department
 Longchamps-sur-Aire, in the Meuse department
 Abbey of Longchamp, a former abbey in the Bois de Boulogne west of Paris
 Longchamp Racecourse (Hippodrome de Longchamp) in the Bois de Boulogne west of Paris

Surname 
 William de Longchamp (fl. 1189–1197), Chancellor of England
 Edmond de Sélys Longchamps (1813–1900), Belgian politician and scientist
 Jean de Selys Longchamps (31 May 1912 – 16 August 1943), Belgian aristocrat and RAF fighter pilot during World War II

Other uses 
 De Tomaso Longchamp, a two-door 2+2 coupe/cabriolet